Dwight Anthony Boykins is a Democratic politician and former member of the Houston City Council in Texas, representing District D where he was born and raised. He was elected to the council in 2013 in the general election on November 5, 2013. He was also a candidate for Mayor of Houston in the 2019 election.

Biography
Dwight Boykins is from Houston, Texas, and attended Stephen F. Austin High School. He received a bachelor's degree in marketing from Texas Southern University. A small business owner, Boykins has also served on the city's Hurricane Ike Relief Fund Board and Oversight Committee of ReBuild Houston.

Political career
Dwight Boykins was sworn in to the Houston City Council in 2014. He represented council District D which runs through Houston's southern quadrant. It contains the Houston Museum District, Texas Medical Center, and the under resourced neighborhoods of the south side. As a member of City Council, Dwight served as Chair of the Ethics, Elections & Council Governance Committee and was a member of the following committees: Budget and Fiscal Affairs; BFA Subcommittee on Debt Financing and Pensions; Regulation and Neighborhood Affairs; and Housing and Community Development.

Mayoral Candidate
Dwight Boykins based his mayoral campaign on streamlining the City's Budget by implementing what he called Zero-Based Budgeting. According to the Boykins' campaign, using Zero-Based Budgeting would have allowed the City to pay for important priorities such as Infrastructure, Pay Parity, Collective Bargaining Obligations, Public Safety, Street Repairs, Potholes, and Trash Pickup.

References

External links
  Councilman Dwight Boykins city website
 
 Ballotpedia

21st-century American politicians
21st-century American writers
21st-century Methodists
African-American people in Texas politics
American community activists
Texas Southern University alumni
Texas Democrats
Living people
Houston City Council members
Year of birth missing (living people)